The de Havilland Canada DHC-3 Otter is a single-engined, high-wing, propeller-driven, short take-off and landing (STOL) aircraft developed by de Havilland Canada. It was conceived to be capable of performing the same roles as the earlier and highly successful Beaver, including as a bush plane, but is overall a larger aircraft.

Design and development
The rugged single-engined, high-wing, propeller-driven DHC-3 Otter was conceived in January 1951 by de Havilland Canada as a larger, more powerful version of its highly successful DHC2 Beaver STOL utility transport.  Dubbed the "King Beaver" during design, it would be the veritable "one-ton truck" to the Beaver's "half-ton" role.

The Otter received Canadian certification in November 1952 and entered production shortly thereafter. Using the same overall configuration as the Beaver, the new, much heavier design incorporated a longer fuselage, greater-span wing, and cruciform tail. Seating in the main cabin expanded from six to 10 or 11. Power was supplied by a 450-kW (600 hp) Pratt & Whitney R-1340 geared radial. The version used in the Otter was geared for lower propeller revolutions and consequently lower airspeed. The electrical system was 28 volts D.C.

Like the Beaver, the Otter can be fitted with skis or floats. The Otter served as the basis for the very successful Twin Otter, which features two wing-mounted Pratt & Whitney Canada PT6 turboprops. A total of 466 Otters were manufactured.

Operational use

 

The DHC-3/CC-123/CSR-123 Otter was used until 1980 by the Royal Canadian Air Force and its successor, the Air Command of the Canadian Forces. It was used in Search and Rescue, as the "CSR" denotes Canadian Search (and) Rescue (type 123) and as a light utility transport, "CC" denoting Canadian Cargo. 
During the Suez Crisis, the Canadian government decided to provide assistance to the United Nations Emergency Force and the Royal Canadian Navy carrier  carried 4 Otters from Halifax to Port Said in Egypt early in 1957, with all four flying off unassisted while the ship was at anchor. This was the only occasion when RCAF fixed wing aircraft operated from a Canadian warship.
It was also operated on EDO floats on water and skis for winter operations on snow. The EDO floats also had wheels for use on runways (amphibious). It was used as army support dropping supplies by parachute, and also non-parachute low-speed, low-altitude air drops, to support the Canadian Army on manoeuvres. In the end it was operated by the Primary Air Reserve in Montreal, Toronto, Edmonton and Winnipeg, with approximately 10 aircraft at each base, as well as by the RSU (Regular (Forces) Support Units) at those bases. It was usually flown with a single pilot (Commissioned Officer) in the left seat and a Technical Air Crewman (NCO) in the right seat. The Kiowa helicopter replaced it in Air Reserve squadrons.

Although the Otter found ready acceptance in bush airlines, as in a similar scenario to the DHC-2 Beaver, the United States Army soon became the largest operator of the aircraft (184 delivered as the U-1A Otter). Other military users included Australia, Canada, and India, but the primary role of the aircraft as a rugged bush plane continues to this day.

An Otter crossed the South Pole in 1957 (see Commonwealth Trans-Antarctic Expedition). The Otter is also popular in the skydiving community and can be found in many dropzones throughout the world.

Otters were used by Qantas from 1958 to 1960 in Papua New Guinea. The Qantas aircraft were then transferred to Trans Australian Airlines (TAA), a major Australian domestic airline, which operated the Otters in Papua New Guinea until 1966 when they were withdrawn from use. TAA was merged with Qantas in 1990.

Modifications
The most extensively modified Otter was RCAF Otter 3682. After initial service as a standard Search and Rescue aircraft it was used to explore the aerodynamic aspects of STOL. In 1958 it was fitted with flaps so outsized that, with their 45 degree droop, it became known as the Batwing Otter. In addition, its tail-wheel undercarriage was replaced with a high energy- absorption 4-wheel arrangement and a very high vertical tail. The next modification replaced the flaps with fully retractable flaps suitable for cruising flight and high drag was obtained with reverse thrust from a J85 turbojet installed in the fuselage behind the cockpit. The third configuration looked a lot like the future Twin Otter and was the first twin-PT6 fixed-wing installation to fly in May 1963 (A twin PT6-engined helicopter, the Kaman K-1125, had flown in April 1963). The piston engine in the nose was replaced with wing-mounted engines to blow over the flaps.
 
Stolairus Aviation of Kelowna, BC, has developed several modifications for the DHC-3 including a STOL Kit, which modifies the wing with a contoured leading edge and drooped wingtips for increased performance.

Some aircraft were converted to turbine power using a PT6A, Walter 601 (manufactured in the Czech Republic), or Garrett/Honeywell TPE331-10, by Texas Turbine Conversions. The Walter M601E-11 Turbine Engine conversion is manufactured and installed by Stolairus Aviation.

A Polish PZL radial engine has also been fitted. Re-engined aircraft have been offered since the 1980s by Airtech Canada as the DHC-3/1000 using current-production 1,000 hp (745 kW) PZL ASz-62 IR radials.

Variants
DHC-3 Otter Single-engined STOL utility transport aircraft.
CSR-123 Otter STOL utility transport aircraft for the Royal Canadian Air Force.
YU-1 Otter Six test and evaluation aircraft for the U.S. Army.
U-1A Otter STOL utility transport aircraft for the U.S. Army.
UC-1 Otter STOL utility transport aircraft for the United States Navy. Later redesignated U-1B Otter in 1962.
 Otters fitted with either Pratt & Whitney Canada PT6A-27 or Pratt & Whitney Canada PT6A-34 turboprop engine.
Airtech Canada DHC-3/1000 OtterConversions powered by PZL Kalisz ASz-62IR engines.
Texas Turbines Super OtterTurbine conversion powered by a  Garret TPE331 turboprop engine
Aerotech Industries Turbine conversion powered by a 900shp Pratt & Whitney Canada PT6A-140A turboprop engine.

Military operators

Argentine Air Force: Former operator

 Royal Australian Air Force: Two Otters (RAAF serial A100-1 and 2) were in service with the RAAF from 1961 to 1967. The aircraft were used for passenger and freight transport duties at the Weapons Research Establishment, Woomera, South Australia.
 No. 1 Air Trials Unit

 Bangladesh Air Force: Former operator

 Burma Air Force

 Royal Canadian Air Force

 Chilean Air Force

 Air Surveillance Service

 Ethiopian Air Force

 Ghana Air Force – acquired 12 Otters (G300 – G311), in service 1961-1973 (serial number: 413, 414, 416, 418, 420, 422, 424, 425, 426, 428, 430, 431).
 4 aircraft had to be written off, 8 aircraft were sold in 1973.
 G300 (s/n 413) crashed on 21 June 1968 in the jungle in the Brong Ahafo region of Ghana and was destroyed.
 G301 (s/n 414) crashed on 31 August 1961 at Kintampo in the Brong Ahafo region of Ghana and was destroyed.
 G302 (s/n 416) crashed on the beach near Takoradi on a date unknown and was destroyed. It was on floats at the time, on a training detail.
 G308 (s/n 426) was written off in service.

 Indian Air Force

 Indonesian Air Force

Khmer Air Force: Former operator

 Royal New Zealand Air Force

 Nicaraguan Air Force

 Royal Norwegian Air Force

 Panamanian Public Forces

 Paraguayan Air Force: One DHC-3 donated by Argentina.

 Tanzanian Air Force

 Royal Air Force

 United States Air Force
 United States Army
 United States Navy
 Otter NU-1B is the oldest aircraft in the U.S. Navy, in service at the U.S. Naval Test Pilot School, Patuxent River, Md.

Civil operators

 Qantas
 Trans Australia Airlines

 Royal Canadian Mounted Police
 Lamb Air
 Harbour Air
 Osprey Wings Ltd
 Provincial Airlines
 Air Saguenay
 Vancouver Island Air
 Bearskin Airlines (formerly)

 Fjellfly
 Varangfly
 Westwing A/S
 Widerøe

 Philippine Airlines (formerly)

 Talkeetna Air Taxi
 Kenmore Air
 Wings Airways
 Key West Seaplane Adventures
 Northwest Seaplanes

 Pacific Island Air

 Volcanic Air (Rotorua)

Accidents
As of June 2019, there have been 119 incidents and accidents involving the DHC-3 resulting in 242 deaths. Listed below are a select few of the most notable ones.

In 1956, two military Otters broke up in mid-air. One had taken off from Downsview and the other from Goose Bay. The Otter requires immediate use of elevator trim to counteract the strong change in pitch caused by the retraction or extension of the flaps. Investigators found that metal contamination in a hydraulic valve allowed the flaps to rapidly retract with the tailplane still fully trimmed, and the consequent nose drop was severe enough to cause structural failure. A filter was added to the flap hydraulic system and an interconnection added between the flaps and tailplane to maintain proper trim as the flaps are operated.
On 22 June 1994, a DHC-3 Otter floatplane, N13GA, registered to and operated by Wings of Alaska of Juneau, Alaska, crashed into the Taku Inlet, 12 miles east of Juneau. The air taxi flight had departed the Taku Lodge located on the Taku River bound for the Juneau downtown dock. Instrument meteorological conditions prevailed at the time of the accident. Six passengers were killed, one passenger was missing and presumed dead, and the pilot and three passengers received serious injuries. The National Transportation Safety Board (NTSB) attributed the accident to continued VFR into IMC and the pilot's consequent failure to maintain altitude above the water surface.
Five of the nine people on board were killed, including former Alaska Senator Ted Stevens. Surviving passengers included former NASA administrator Sean O'Keefe and his teenage son, both of whom sustained injuries.
On 23 September 2011, a DHC-3T Turbine Otter floatplane, N361TT, sustained substantial damage during a go-around and subsequent low-altitude maneuver at Heitman Lake, about 5 miles south-southwest of Kodiak, Alaska, killing the pilot and injuring the two passengers. One of the passengers reported that during the go-around, the airplane struck a tree on the shoreline and crashed.
On 7 July 2013, a DHC-3 Otter registered to Rediske Air, N93PC, crashed on takeoff at Soldotna Airport, Alaska, killing all ten aboard. There were no surviving witnesses and the aircraft did not carry a flight data recorder, but the NTSB was able to reconstruct the aircraft's flight path using a recovered mobile phone video recorded by a passenger. The NTSB attributed the accident to a stall caused by the operator's failure to weigh cargo and verify that the aircraft was loaded within its center of gravity limits.
 On 25 June 2015, a Promech Air DHC-3 Otter crashed into the face of a granite cliff near Ella Lake, Alaska, 20 miles (32 km) northeast of Ketchikan. The aircraft carried a pilot and eight passengers who were tourists on a sightseeing excursion from a Holland America Line coastal cruise aboard the cruise ship MS Westerdam. All nine people on board died. The NTSB determined that the pilot had a history of poor decision making and that the company had a compromised culture that resulted in an "operation in which safety competed with performance and revenue".
Three people were killed in the crash.
 On 13 May 2019, in the 2019 Alaska mid-air collision, a Taquan Air DHC-3 Turbine Otter floatplane, N959PA, collided with a Mountain Air Service DHC-2 Beaver, N952DB, over George Inlet, Alaska, with the loss of one passenger aboard the DHC-3 and five passengers and crew aboard the DHC-2. The NTSB attributed the accident to the inherent limitations of the see-and-avoid concept, along with the absence of alerts from both airplanes' traffic display systems." Due to the angle of approach, both pilots' viewpoints were partially blocked by the aircraft structure or seated passengers. The NTSB identified Taquan's inadequate preflight checklist and the Federal Aviation Administration's failure to require Taquan to implement a safety management system as contributing factors.
 On 4 September 2022, a DHC-3 floatplane operated by Friday Harbor Seaplanes, N725TH, crashed in Puget Sound near Whidbey Island, Washington, killing all ten aboard the aircraft. On October 24, the NTSB announced that the horizontal stabilizer actuator had separated into two pieces at a threaded assembly fitting, and that the actuator lock ring was missing from the wreckage. The next day, Viking Air issued a service letter requiring DHC-3 Otter operators to inspect the aircraft and ensure that the actuator's lock ring is present.

Specifications (landplane)

See also

References

Notes

Bibliography
 Hayes, Karl E. DHC-3 Otter – A History (CD-ROM). Crakaig, Killiney Hill Road, Killiney, Co. Dublin, Ireland: Karl E. Hayes Publisher, 2006. (also available via CANAV Books, Toronto)
 Hotson, Fred W. The de Havilland Canada Story. Toronto: CANAV Books, 1983. .
 Michell, Simon. (ed.). Jane's Civil and Military Aircraft Upgrades 1994–95. Coulsdon, UK: Jane's Information Group, 1994. .
Milberry, Larry. Aviation in Canada. Toronto: McGraw-Hill Ryerson Ltd., 1979. .
 Molson, Ken M. and Harold A. Taylor. Canadian Aircraft Since 1909. Stittsville, Ontario: Canada's Wings, Inc., 1982. .

 Rossiter, Sean. The Immortal Beaver: The World's Greatest Bush Plane. Vancouver: Douglas & McIntyre, 1999. .
 Rossiter, Sean. Otter & Twin Otter: The Universal Airplanes. Vancouver: Douglas & McIntyre, 1998. .

 Taylor, John W.R., ed. Jane's All The World's Aircraft 1988–89. Coulsdon, UK: Jane's Defence Data, 1988. .

External links

 DHC-3archive.com 
 de Havilland Canada DHC-3 CC-123 Otter
 De Havilland Canada D.H.C.3 'Otter'
 US Navy Otter service in Antarctica

 
1950s Canadian civil utility aircraft
1960s Canadian military utility aircraft
DHC-3
Single-engined tractor aircraft
High-wing aircraft
Cruciform tail aircraft
STOL aircraft
Aircraft first flown in 1951